Layered clothing is a fashion technique that is utilized by dressing many garments that are worn on top of each other. Flexible clothing can be worn to suit the requirements of each situation by adding or removing layers, or by changing one layer and leaving the others. Two thin layers can be warmer yet lighter than one thick layer, because the air trapped between layers serves as thermal insulation. 

Layered clothing is particularly helpful in cold climates, where clothing must transfer moisture, provide warmth, and protect from wind and rain. In a hot and dry climate, clothes have very different functional requirements: they must block the heat from the sun and allow for sufficient air circulation to cool down the body of the wearer as well as allow for sweat to evaporate.

Such clothes are often made of advanced synthetic materials or wool, and are not very expensive. The use of layered clothing allows the wearer to remove a layer as their activity intensifies and body temperature increases, or conversely, add a layer as they begin to cool down.

Layers 
Usually, layered clothing consists of at least three layers. They are identified as follows:

 The inner layer provides comfort by keeping the skin dry. Also called base layer or first layer.
 The mid layer provides warmth. Also called insulating layer.
 The shell layer protects from wind and/or water. Also called an outer layer, which works as protection over the other two layers.

Often clothing combines two adjacent layers, as in the case of warm undergarments that provide both comfort and insulation.

Inner or base layer  
The purpose of the inner layer is to draw sweat away from the skin to the outer layers, which makes the wearer feel warmer and more comfortable. The transfer of moisture happens due to capillary action, sometimes called wicking. The used materials are called wicking materials. When moisture has moved from the skin into (nonabsorbent) clothing, it has more surface area and will evaporate faster. If a piece of clothing does not transfer moisture well, it is not strictly an inner layer garment at all but simply a comfortable mid-layer garment.

 Wool has a combination of wicking and water-repelling properties and, along with silk, is the most expensive  of the materials used for base layers. How comfortable wool feels against skin varies greatly, with Merino wool being softer . Wool is highly odour resistant.
 Synthetic materials such as polyester, polyethylene, and microfibre-based fabrics are inexpensive. They have water-wicking properties. They can also carry specialist finishes, such as anti-bacterial agents, which reduce odours, and insect repellent. However, in the absence of such anti-odour treatment, they quickly become foul-smelling. This is because their hydrophobic properties cause them to strongly absorb the short-chain fatty acids that are responsible for body odour.
 Silk is expensive. It feels comfortable but is less warm, weaker, and harder to take care of.
 Cotton is usually inexpensive. It absorbs moisture easily and is slow to dry out. When wet or damp, cotton loses its insulating abilities and becomes more thermally conductive than other materials. This makes it suitable for warm temperatures but potentially dangerous for cold or wet conditions.

Mid layer 

The mid layer is needed in cold weather to provide additional insulation. The use of multiple thin layers facilitates the adjustment of warmth. The mid-layer should be more loose-fitting than the inner layer, as this leaves insulating air between the layers. However, if the best possible moisture transfer is desired, too great a gap between any adjacent layers of clothing may reduce the moisture transfer by capillary action from one piece of clothing to another. On the other hand, very loose-fitting layers can allow more removal of moisture (and heat) via air circulation.

 Wool is the traditional mid layer material with several good properties: it has good insulation even when wet, absorbs moisture but does not feel wet even when it holds significant moisture, and transfers moisture.
 Fleece made from PETE or other synthetics has many of the features of wool, but is lighter. It provides good insulation even when wet, absorbs very little moisture, and dries quickly. Although no longer commonly used in the industrialized world, natural sheepskin fleece could also serve the mid layer function.
 Down has a very good warmth to weight ratio, and can be compressed to take up very little room. On the downside, it is expensive, makes a thick garment, dries slowly, loses its insulating properties when wet or compressed, and stops lofting properly after being washed several times.
 Synthetic Fiberfill such as polyester fiber is used similarly to down, but does not have as good a warmth to weight ratio. However, it is less expensive, provides better insulation when wet, dries quickly, and absorbs very little moisture. There are brands of very fine fiberfill, like Thinsulate, PrimaLoft or Thermolite, that provide higher warmth for a given thickness.
 Cotton, as with the inner layer, is a cheap alternative, but a reasonable choice only when low insulation and moisture transfer is needed.

Shell layer 

The outermost clothes are called the shell layer, but only if they block wind or water or have good mechanical strength. Ideally the shell layer lets moisture through to the outside (that is, is breathable), while not letting wind and water pass through from the outside to the inside. While this is enabled to some degree by modern materials, even the best and most expensive materials involve a slight trade-off between breath-ability and water- and wind resistance.

If heavy sweating is expected, one should avoid wearing any shell layer garments unless their protective properties are essential. For example, when one is jogging, no traditional shell layer is likely to be able to transfer enough moisture to keep the wearer feeling dry. But as more air permeable membranes emerge, when combined with pit zips the amount of moisture being transferred outwards would be sufficient for cardiovascular pursuits. As a general rule, one should consider using sufficiently warm mid layer clothes.

Both "soft" and "hard" shell jackets and layers exist. Hard shells are commonly woven fabric and do not rip. Soft shell may rip more easily, but are more flexible. 

 Plastic raincoats protect completely from water and wind, but let no moisture through. To compensate for that, raincoats usually have flap-covered holes and are very loose-fitting at the bottom to allow air circulation.
 Waterproof breathable (hard shell) materials are waterproof and somewhat breathable. Their essential element is a thin, porous membrane that blocks liquid water, but lets through water vapor (evaporated sweat). The more expensive materials are typically more breathable. Well-known brand, Gore-Tex, has the best breathability, although it has less wind resistance.
 Water resistant (soft shell) materials generally block water only partially, but more fully waterproof soft shells are emerging such as polartec neoshell or DryQ Elite. On the other hand, they are usually more breathable and comfortable, thinner, and cheaper than completely waterproof materials. Water-repellent coatings are often used. Before waterproof-breathable shells were invented, the "60/40" (60% cotton, 40% nylon) parka was widely used. Soft shells are not water "proof".
The term soft shell is increasingly used to describe garments that combine partial or full water resistance with partial or full wind breaking ability. Soft shell fabrics come in numerous varieties with many garments offering a combination, such as a wicking layer. In many cases insulation is combined in an attempt to replace several layers with a single highly flexible one. One of the most unique characteristics of the woven soft-shell fabrics is the combination of windproof, a high level of water resistance, and stretch -- in many cases four-way stretch. Solid plastic films and micro-perforated laminates typically breathe much less and do not stretch at all.

Adjusting a layering system 

As the intensity of exercise or environmental conditions change, the amount or quality of layers worn should be changed. In particular, if clothes become wet from sweating during heavy exercise, they can be much too cold during the following period of rest. Below are two basic strategies for this problem.

Vents 

Some clothes feature adjustable vents, such as below armpits. The positioning and design of the vents allow for area specific cooling while only marginally reducing exterior moisture resistance.

Removing layers 

Removing the shell layer during heavy exercise can pose problems if the clothes underneath lack required mechanical strength or waterproofing. In such situations, using a mid-layer with enough of the required shell layer properties can be a good choice.

Fashion use 
Combining different garments in layers can be used to create a variety of outfits. This provides similar benefits to practical layering, in that the wearer can shed layers according to changes in temperature. Fashionable layering is also a way to produce different looks and mix colors in various ways. It saves money for the consumer, who can create a totally new look simply by swapping out one piece of the outfit.

See also 
 Waterproof fabric
 Durable water repellent
 Heated clothing

References

External links 
 Don’t Get Hot and You Won’t Get Cold
 ABC of Hiking

Clothing by function